Hakim Syed Muhammad Karam Hussain (1870–25 June 1953) was an Unani practitioner from Tijara, Alwar.

Biography

Education
After initial education from his hometown 'Tijara', he moved to Meerut at the age of 14 years. In Meerut, he took expertise, knowledge and proficiency on ‘Unani Tibb’ from two leading practitioners 'Hakim Mohammad Hasan Haziq' and 'Hakim Baldev Sahai'. Hakim Hasan Haziq (died 1928) was the author of many books on Unani medicine including 'Lataif-e Ghalib' from Naami Press, Meerut, while Hakim Baldev Sahai was himself a student of Hakim Ahsanullah Khan, prime minister and royal physician to Emperor Bahadur Shah Zafar of Delhi.

Practicing Unani medicine
Hakim Syed Karam Husain started practicing Unani at Tijara, Alwar in early 1893. He established his own Unani pharmaceutics, by the name of, Dawakhana Shifaul Amraz in 1894 . He was a personal Unani physician of Maharaja of Alwar Jai Singh Prabhakar (1882–1937) and has been a standing committee member of All India Unani and Ayurvedic Tibbi Conference, of whose Hakim Ajmal Khan was the president.

Maharaja Jai Singh Prabhakar once invited some significant Unani physicians working in the state of Alwar to discuss the future course and progress and promotion of Unani medicine. Hakim Syed Karam Hussain was the chief-de-mission of that delegation. In that delegation, the other physicians who were present: Hakim Syed Mohammad (Khairtal), Hakim Mohammad Sulaiman, Hakim Mohammad Umar Fasih, Hakim Imam Ali, Hakim Syed Ahmad Ali Akbarabadi and Hakim Ziauddin (Tijara).

Regional personality
He was popularly known as Rais-e Tijara, a very pious and religious person and a resident of Qazi Mohalla, of the Tijara city before the partition of India in 1947. He bought seven Havelis at Tijara including the 'Haveli Qadeem' (the oldest private mansion at the Qazi Mohalla). In addition, he had two other houses in Delhi. In the course of leisure moment, his favourite places of visit were Mount Abu and Delhi. The following Persian commemorative inscription can still be seen at the main entrance of his 'Haveli Qadeem' at Tijara:

[By "شاہ اکبر" (Shah Akbar), meaning both 'Emperor Akbar' and 'Great Emperor', the poet parallels God and Jalaluddin Muhammad Akbar, and asserts 'Great Emperor' to both].

The above qata was written at the time when Emperor Akbar visited Tijara while moving to Fatehpur Sikri from Delhi. According to Major P.W. Powlett (late settlement officer of Ulwar), "Akbar appears to have given some attention to Mewat in AH. 957 (A.D. 1579), he visited Ulwur (now Alwar) on his way to Fatehpur Sikri".

Community and social works
Being a well-off person in the region of Mewat, he assisted many community and social works by lending either monetary donation or moral support to many organisations such as 'Anjuman Khadimul Islam' (Alwar), 'Jamiat Markaziya Tabligh-ul-Islam' (Ambala), 'Anjuman-e-Himayat-e-Islam' / 'Anjuman-i-Himayat-i-Islam' (Lahore), 'Jamia Masjid' (Tijara) and 'Madrasa Islamia' (Tijara). Ghulam Bhik Nairang was the founder of 'Jamiat Markaziya Tabligh-ul-Islam' (Ambala). Hakim Syed Karam Husain also assisted Maulana Mohammad Ilyas in many occasions when he visited nearby towns of Mewat.

The plaque, with the name of 'Hakim Syed Karam Husain', found in a well of Jamia Masjid located at Bazaar during cleansing drive and is now preserved in the Jamia Masjid complex suggests that the main gate of the mosque (Sadar Darwaza) was once built by him. The mosque is believed to get damage during the Partition of India.

It is because of the influence of Hakim Karam Husain, that he brought Maharaja Jai Singh Prabhakar at Tijara to visit 'Madrasa Islamia' (Islamia School). Raja Ghazanfar Ali Khan, the then Education Minister at the State of Alwar, also accompanied with him. On the main gate of school, it was written. 

He also supported in the publication of books of other authors in both Unani and other literary works. To name a few Tibbi books, which acknowledge his name are 'Tarjuma Qarabadin Azam', 'Tarjuma Aqsarai', 'Tauzih al Advia', 'Ilajun Nisan', Afsana Hikmat', 'Tafaruqul Amraz was Tafaruqul Advia', 'Moonisul Atibba' and 'Usoole Sehat'. Similarly, he helped in the publication of general books such as 'Qutub al Madar Talifat Shikwah' by Maulana Syed Ali Shikwa nabirah Maulana Syed Shah Jurat Ali Arghwani of Makanpur, 'Swanehumri Kalyari' by Mohammad Ashiq Ali, 'Risalah Islahul Milad' by Maulana Qari Abdul Latif Khan (Teacher, Madrasa Aaliya, Agra), 'Gulzar Risalat wa Guldasta-e Shahadat' by Qazi Zakiruddin, 'Nasihatul Muslamin al Maroof Musaddas Kabiruddin' by Aziz Kabiruddin Kalim, 'Kashiful Asrar' by Peerji Ahmad Shah Rampuri, 'Masnawi Farishta Rahmat' and 'Anjam Mohabbat' by Maulana Hakim Mohammad Ahmad Alwari and 'Gulshan Sairul Mashhoor ba Yaadgar Darbar Alwar'. In addition, he got printed a copy of Quran from Gulzar Mohammadi Press, Meerut in 1889 (1307 AH).

Poetry
He had not only great interest in Urdu poetry, but also as a Pen name Natiq (Takhallus), composed many poems. He learned the art of poetry from his teacher 'Hakim Mohammad Hasan Haziq' and 'Isharat Ali Khan Sadq Meeruti'. He once acknowledged,

Family history
Hakim Syed Karam Husain (1287AH/1870AD – 11th Shawwal 1372 AH/25 June 1953) was a direct descendant of Qazi Syed Rafi Mohammad. He was merely 8 years old when his father Qazi Mir Imdad Ali died. He was trained under the guidance of his mother, Fayyazun Nisan, who was a very talented woman. She inherited all the good qualities from her father, Hussainuddin (died on 11 Dhu al-Hijjah 1278 AH / 1861 AD), a man of horse business from Hyderabad. Hussainuddin also had a good taste in literature. Apart from Fayyazun Nisan, he had another daughter, Bayazun Nisan from his wife Siddiqun Nisan (daughter of Ghulam Askari Ibn Salahuddin ibn Karimuddin ibn Muqtada ibn Qazi Ghulam Murtaza).

With family members and friends, Karam Husain went for Hajj pilgrimage from Tijara in January 1934 (1354 AH). With him, his wife (Mrs. Hakimun Nisa), sister (Mrs. Anwari Begum), elder son (Hakim Syed Atiqul Qadir), and others such as Khwaja Kamaluddin (Alias Mian Kallan Shah), Qazi Saeeduddin and Mrs. Zaeefa Khatoon were there.

Many of his family members and relatives are remembered for their role and sacrifices in India's First War of Independence.

After his demise, he was laid to rest adjacent to the grave of his wife Hakimun Nisa, who herself died at the age of 81 years on 14th Rabiulawwal 1370 AH/1950AD, in his family graveyard located at Church Road, Mohallah Jinsi, Bhopal.

Books 
He was the author of many books some are published while some are extant as unpublished manuscript on Unani. Following is a list of published books:
 من موہنی الحب 'Man Mohnee' (Al-Hub).
 Taufah-e Jahan Maroof ba Keemiya-e Ishrat
 Nisab al Tibb al Maroof Tibbi Khaliq- Bari
 Risala Khizab
 Risala Khwas Aaq
 Risala Maqsood al Talib
 Mafatihul Ghaib
 Taskhir Khalaiq Tarjuma Kitab Aqdul Mohabbat
 Mafatihul Mominin
 Ramzanul Muslamin
 Risala Fazail al Haj
 Chahal Kaaf
 Darood Mastaghat
 Harz Murtazvi Maroof ba 'Duwai Saifi'
 Darbar Sultanul Hind
 Irshad-e Wahidi
 Tazkira Ahbab
 Jashne Maulood
 Kitab al Moalijat
 Bayaz-e Tibb
 Sharah-e Qasida Ghausiya
 Waqiful Ayub wa kashiful Qaloob al Maroof 'Masnavi Mutmain'
 Risala Qadm Shareef
 Safar Nama-e Haj

Apart from various books and monographs, he edited monthly periodical 'Masih-e Zaman' from 1926 to 1944. This periodical in 5000 copies was first printed from 'Hindustan Electric Printing Works' (Delhi) and then from 'Matba Abul Alai' (Agra) and 'Mahboobul Matabi' (Delhi). There was no printing press at Tijara, Alwar.

Legacy
 Two sons – Hafiz Hakim Syed Atiqul Qadir (1909–2000) and Hakim Syed Fazlur Rahman (1912–1994), whom Hakim Syed Karam Husain trained the arts of Unani Tibb.
 A well-settled 'Dawakhana Shifaul Amraz'.

See also 
Hakim Karam Husain Museum on History of Medicine and Sciences
Tijara
Hakim Syed Zillur Rahman (grandson)
Syed Ziaur Rahman (great-grandson)
Munshi Hakimuddin
Hafiz Mazhar Husain
Ghulam Mansoor
Ghulam Ahmad Faroghi
Sardar Bahadur Tafazzul Hussain Khan

References 

Indian Muslims
People from Tijara
Scientists from Bhopal
1870 births
1953 deaths
Unani practitioners
People from Alwar district
People from Alwar
Gardēzī Sadaat
Urdu-language writers
Medical doctors from Madhya Pradesh
20th-century Indian medical doctors